Lasse Schöne (born 27 May 1986) is a Danish professional footballer who plays as a midfielder or winger for Eredivisie club NEC and the Denmark national team. He is known for his set piece abilities.

Schöne spent his entire professional career in the Netherlands, with Heerenveen, De Graafschap, NEC and Ajax, before moving to Genoa in Italy in 2019. During his time in the Netherlands, he scored 85 league goals.

Schöne scored on his full international debut in 2009 and was part of the Danish squad at UEFA Euro 2012 and the 2018 FIFA World Cup.

Club career

De Graafschap
Born in Glostrup, Schöne began playing youth football with Himmelev-Veddelev BK and moved on to Tåstrup B.70 and then Lyngby. In 2002, he moved to the youth team of Eredivisie club Heerenveen. He spent four years with the team without playing any league matches then moved to Eerste Divisie club De Graafschap in 2006. In his first season, he helped De Graafschap win promotion to the Eredivisie. In his two seasons with De Graafschap, he scored 12 goals in 70 matches.

NEC
Schöne signed for NEC in summer 2008. He scored the winning goal for NEC away at Spartak Moscow in December 2008, which sent the team through to the next round of the UEFA Cup. The club and the fans picked him as NEC's player of the year, a title he also won at his previous club, De Graafschap.

Ajax
On 18 April 2012, Schöne joined Ajax on a contract valid until 2015. A number of other Danish players had played for Ajax, including Michael Laudrup, who had been a role model for him throughout his career. The club and the fans picked him as the player of the year in 2014. On 2 March 2015, he signed a new contract lasting until summer 2017, and on 22 February 2017, he signed a new contract lasting until summer 2019. On 27 February 2019, he became the international player with the most games played for Ajax, by surpassing Søren Lerby's 269 games.

On 5 March 2019, in the UEFA Champions League, Schöne scored Ajax's final goal of the Round of 16-second leg against Real Madrid, by converting a direct free kick that went past the Real Madrid goalkeeper Thibaut Courtois. The victory completed a surprise comeback, the Dutch side winning 4–1 at the Santiago Bernabéu Stadium and 5–3 on aggregate to knock the European Champions out of the Champions League.

Genoa
On 9 August 2019, Schöne joined Serie A club Genoa on a two-year contract. The reported fee was €1.5 million. He scored his first goal giving the lead in an eventual 2–1 loss against Milan. In the same match, he also missed a 90th-minute penalty kick.

In October, 2020, the former Ajax star discovered he was effectively frozen out of the first Genoa team, as he cannot be selected for Serie A football without being named on their list of eligible players. His agent was not happy with this and plans to take legal action, saying that, cases similar to this have already been analyzed by FIFA and the CAS. He was not part of new coach Rolando Maran’s plans and was told he could terminate his contract early by mutual consent to leave as a free agent. Schone was one of the 17 Genoa players who was diagnosed with COVID-19 and a transfer seemed a far away option in the final days of the window due to his COVID status, as well as the fact that both he and his agent did not know that he was left off the list of eligible players for the first Genoa team. On 7 January 2021, his contract was terminated.

Heerenveen
On 11 February 2021, it was announced that Schöne had signed with SC Heerenveen on a six-month contract, returning to the club where he played between 2002 and 2006. Schöne hopes to get back into the Denmark national team to play at UEFA Euro 2020.

Return to NEC
On 9 June 2021, it was announced that Schöne had returned to NEC, signing a two-year contract, until the summer of 2023.

International career

Youth
Schöne began his international career with the Denmark national under-16 team, scoring a goal on his debut in August 2001. He played a total of ten matches and scored one goal for the under-17 and under-18 teams from July 2002 to March 2004. After joining De Graafschap, Schöne made his debut for the under-21 team in March 2007. He played a total of nine matches and scored one goal for the under-21s until October 2008.

Senior
On 12 August 2009, on his debut for the Denmark senior team in a friendly against Chile, Schöne scored less than a minute after being put into action in the second half. The goal was the equalizer in an eventual 1–2 loss at the Brøndby Stadium.

He was unable to play in the 2010 FIFA World Cup in South Africa because of a knee injury.

In 2018 he was named in Denmark's squad for the 2018 FIFA World Cup in Russia. He played in three matches, starting in one, but did not score.

Career statistics

Club

International

Scores and results list Denmark's goal tally first, score column indicates score after each Schöne goal.

Honours
De Graafschap
 Eerste Divisie: 2006–07

Ajax
 Eredivisie: 2012–13, 2013–14, 2018–19
 KNVB Cup: 2018–19
 Johan Cruyff Shield: 2013, 2019
 UEFA Europa League runner-up: 2016–17
Individual
 De Graafschap Player of the Year: 2007–08
 NEC Player of the Year: 2008–09
 Ajax Player of the Year (Rinus Michels Award): 2013–14
 Ajax Goal of the Decade: 2020
 Eredivisie Team of the Year: 2013–14, 2017–18, 2018–19

References

External links

National team profile at dbu.dk 
Lasse Schöne at Voetbal International 
 

1986 births
Living people
People from Glostrup Municipality
Danish men's footballers
Denmark youth international footballers
Denmark under-21 international footballers
Denmark international footballers
Association football midfielders
FC Roskilde players
Taastrup FC players
Lyngby Boldklub players
SC Heerenveen players
De Graafschap players
NEC Nijmegen players
AFC Ajax players
Jong Ajax players
Genoa C.F.C. players
Eredivisie players
Eerste Divisie players
Serie A players
Danish expatriate men's footballers
Expatriate footballers in the Netherlands
Expatriate footballers in Italy
Danish expatriate sportspeople in the Netherlands
Danish expatriate sportspeople in Italy
UEFA Euro 2012 players
Danish people of German descent
2018 FIFA World Cup players
Sportspeople from the Capital Region of Denmark